The 1964 FIBA World Championship for Women (Spanish: 1964 Campeonato Mundial FIBA Femenino) was hosted in Peru from 1964. The Soviet Union won the tournament.

Preliminary round

Group A

|}

Group B

|}

Group C

|}

Classification round

|}

Final round

|}

Final standings

Awards

References
Results

FIBA Women's Basketball World Cup
FIBA
FIBA
FIBA
FIBA World Championship for Women
FIBA World Championship for Women
Women's basketball in Peru